"The After-Dinner Joke" is the 17th episode of eighth season of the British BBC anthology TV series Play for Today. The episode was a television play that was originally broadcast on 14 February 1978. "The After-Dinner Joke" was written by Caryl Churchill, directed by Colin Bucksey, produced by Margaret Matheson, and starred Paula Wilcox.

Unfolding through a sequence of 66 short, episodic scenes and utilising many characters, the drama explores the politics of charity through the story of a young woman called Selby who wants "to do good." As a charity worker, she studiously avoids becoming embroiled in political issues, only to discover during the course of the action that this is impossible. "There's something political about everything," a local Mayor assures her.

It has also been produced for the stage, including a major revival at the Orange Tree Theatre in Richmond, London, directed by Sophie Boyce in May 2014.

Cast 
 Paula Wilcox as Selby
 Richard Vernon as Price
 Clive Merrison as Dent
 Derek Smith as the Mayor

References

Sources
 Churchill, Caryl. 1990. Shorts. London: Nick Hern Books. .

External links
  

1978 British television episodes
1978 television plays
British television plays
Play for Today
Plays by Caryl Churchill